The 1977–78 Indiana Hoosiers men's basketball team represented Indiana University. Their head coach was Bobby Knight, who was in his 7th year. The team played its home games in Assembly Hall in Bloomington, Indiana, and was a member of the Big Ten Conference.

The Hoosiers finished the regular season with an overall record of 21–8 and a conference record of 12–6, finishing 2nd in the Big Ten Conference. After missing out on the NCAA Tournament last season, Indiana was invited to participate in the 1978 NCAA Tournament, where Bobby Knight and the Hoosiers advanced to the Sweet Sixteen.

Roster

Schedule/Results

|-
!colspan=8| Regular Season
|-

|-
!colspan=8| NCAA Tournament

References

Indiana Hoosiers men's basketball seasons
Indiana
Indiana
Indiana Hoosiers
Indiana Hoosiers